14 Weeks of Silence is the third album by Russian singer Zemfira which became her second best-selling album after Forgive Me My Love with sales around 1 million copies sold in Russia and 500,000 sold in Ukraine according to her label. In comparison with her earlier albums it showcases softer and more polished sound, with prominent use of keyboards, inspired by work of such bands as Radiohead.

Track listing

References

External links

2002 albums
Zemfira albums
Russian-language albums
Sony Music albums